Sławomir Rynkiewicz Berg  (born 19 November 1970) is a Polish-born Swedish film, television actor. He came to Stockholm in 1992. Rynkiewicz graduated from the Kulturama School in Stockholm

Selected filmography
2018: Sjölyckan, directed by Niclas Carlsson 
2012: "Shoo Bre", directed by Djengo Esmer
2012: "Den sista dokusåpan", directed by Oskar Mellander
2009: "Solsidan", directed by Felix Herngren
2009: "Inga Lindström", directed by John Delbridge
2009: "Våra vänners liv", directed by Jesper Andersson
2002: "The biggest car show in the World: 25th annual POWER BIG MEET"

Television ( TV show)
2012: "69 saker du vill veta om sex" TV3
2011: reality-show "Waterwörld" TV6
2009: "Cirkus Möller" TV4
2009: "Bläsningen" w TV3

Music video
2012: The Super Orchestra, "Jealous"
2010: Ola Svensson, "Riot"
2009: Le Kid, "Hjärta"

Music Producer
Skysoundtrack (music producer Slawomir Rynkiewicz) in 2011 with "Danddys with money" came to the final in the Swedish music poll METRO ON STAGE

References

External links

Polish male film actors
Swedish male film actors
Swedish male comedians
Swedish male television actors
20th-century Swedish comedians
21st-century Swedish comedians
20th-century Swedish male actors
21st-century Swedish male actors
Polish emigrants to Sweden
Male actors from Gdańsk
Living people
1970 births